Nikolay Mikhailovich Janson (24 November 1882 – 20 June 1938) was an Estonian revolutionary, Soviet politician and statesman.

Janson was born in Saint Petersburg. He was Prosecutor General of the Russian SFSR (named on 16 January 1928) and People's Commissar for Water Transport (named on 30 January 1931). On 13 March 1934 he was demoted to the post of Deputy People's Commissar for the offshore part. In July 1935 he lost that position, too, and in October 1935 he was named Deputy Chief of the Northern Sea Route. He was arrested on December 6, 1937, and accused of anti-Soviet espionage and sabotage. He was sentenced to death on 20 June 1938 and shot in Moscow on the same day.

References

1882 births
1938 deaths
Lawyers from Saint Petersburg
People from Sankt-Peterburgsky Uyezd
Old Bolsheviks
Soviet politicians
Communist Party of Estonia politicians
Great Purge victims from Estonia
20th-century Estonian politicians
Central Executive Committee of the Soviet Union members